José Noel Pérez de Alba (born 21 September 1961) is a Mexican politician affiliated with the PRI. He served as a federal deputy of the LXII Legislature of the Mexican Congress representing Jalisco, and previously served as a local deputy in the LIX Legislature of the Congress of Jalisco.

References

1961 births
Living people
Politicians from Jalisco
Institutional Revolutionary Party politicians
21st-century Mexican politicians
Members of the Congress of Jalisco
Monterrey Institute of Technology and Higher Education alumni
Deputies of the LXII Legislature of Mexico
Members of the Chamber of Deputies (Mexico) for Jalisco